Deportivo Toluca F.C. Femenil is a Mexican women's football club based in Toluca, Mexico. The club has been the female section of Deportivo Toluca F.C. since 2017. The team will play in the Liga MX Femenil which is scheduled to commence in September 2017.

Personnel

Coaching staff

Source: Liga MX Femenil

Players

Current squad
As of 15 January 2023

References

Liga MX Femenil teams
Association football clubs established in 2017
Women's association football clubs in Mexico
2017 establishments in Mexico